Every Last One of Them is a 2021 American action thriller film directed by Christian Sesma and starring Paul Sloan, Jake Weber, Taryn Manning, Mike Hatton, Michael Madsen, and Richard Dreyfuss.

It was released in the United States on October 22, 2021, by Saban Films.

Premise
A man looking for his missing daughter, but his search uncovers a larger conspiracy involving a Chinatown-derail big capitalism deal over water rights.

Cast
 Richard Dreyfuss as Murphy
 Taryn Manning as Maggie
 Jake Weber as Nichols
 Mike Hatton as Bartlett
 Paul Sloan as Jake Hunter
 Brian Hayes Currie as Stone
 Nick Vallelonga as Victor
 Mary Christina Brown as Kim
 Claire Kniaz as Melissa
 Viktoriya Dov as Jade

Production
The film was shot in Coachella, California.

Release
The film was released in theaters and on demand and digital platforms on October 22, 2021.

Reception
Leslie Felperin of The Guardian awarded the film one star out of five.  Jeffrey Anderson of Common Sense Media also awarded the film one star out of five.

Accolades

References

External links
 
 

2021 films
2021 action thriller films
2020s English-language films
American action thriller films
Films shot in California
2020s American films